W Crucis is a single-lined eclipsing variable star system in the constellation Crux.  It has a spectral class of F8/G1Ia/abe indicating a yellow supergiant with emission lines in its spectrum.

W Crucis varies in brightness between magnitude 8.18 and 9.01 over a period of 198.5 days.  Its light curve has been observed to be asymmetric with subsequent maxima differing in height, which is described as the so-called O'Connell effect.  A secondary minimum is observed when the brightness drops to magnitude 8.5.  The shape and duration of the eclipses show that the two stars are detached and that there is an accretion disk around the primary, more massive, star.

Spectral lines can only be seen for one of the stars, a yellow supergiant. The other, more massive, star is hidden within an accretion disk of material stripped from the supergiant. The hidden star has properties that suggest it is a mid-B main sequence star. The supergiant is deformed by the gravity of the more massive primary star, fills its Roche lobe, and is losing mass.

It is the source of the emission lines seen in the spectrum.

References

Crux (constellation)
Algol variables
Crucis, W
B-type main-sequence stars
F-type supergiants
059483
105998
Durchmusterung objects
G-type supergiants